The Archdiocese of Cáceres is an archdiocese of the Roman Catholic Church in the Philippines. It is a Metropolitan See that comprises the Bicol Region, while directly overseeing the third, fourth, and fifth congressional districts of Camarines Sur, Naga City, Iriga City and the Municipality of Gainza. The archdiocese, having been founded in 1595 in Nueva Cáceres (now Naga City), is also considered one of the oldest dioceses in the Philippines with Cebu, Segovia and Manila, and once had jurisdiction that stretched from Samar in the south and Isabela Province in the north. The seat of the archdiocese is currently located in Naga City, also known as the Queen City of Bicol.

The archdiocese is also home to Our Lady of Peñafrancia, the Patroness of Bicol, and is considered to be one of the largest Marian Pilgrimages in Asia.

History
The Diocese of Cáceres was established as the suffragan of Manila on August 14, 1595. This was by virtue of the Papal Bull Super specula militantis ecclesiae issued by Clement VIII. The diocese extended over the provinces of Camarines and Albay as far as and including the islands of Ticao, Masbate, Burias and Catanduanes; the province of Tayabas as far as and including Lucban; and, in the contracosta of Mauban to Binangonan, Polo, Baler and Casiguran. The official name given to the ecclesiastical jurisdiction is Ecclesia Cacerensis in Indiis Orientalius. The name was taken from Nueva Cáceres (now Naga City), also indicated as the seat of the diocese. Friar Luís de Maldonado, OFM was appointed the first bishop of the Diocese of Cáceres. It was elevated to the status of archdiocese on June 29, 1951 through the virtue of the papal bull Quo in Philippine Republica by Pope Pius XII. The papal bull also created its two suffragan sees—the Diocese of Legazpi and Sorsogon.

Leonardo Legaspi O.P., who was also the first Filipino Rector Magnificus of the Pontifical and Royal University of Santo Tomas, and the first Vicar of the Dominican Province of the Philippines once served as archbishop of the archdiocese.

According to a Holy See Press Office Vatican Information Service (VIS) online news release on Saturday, September 8, 2012, Pope Benedict XVI had appointed Bishop Prelate of the Roman Catholic Territorial Prelature of Infanta Rolando J. Tria Tirona, O.C.D., as Metropolitan Archbishop of the Roman Catholic Archdiocese of Cáceres to succeed the retiring Archbishop Legaspi.

Coat of arms
A pallium divides the shield into three fields. The rose and the blue background represent Our Lady of Peñafrancia, the patroness of the Bicol region.

The silver eagle against the gold background represents Saint John the apostle and evangelist, the titular of the cathedral at Naga. The open book represents the Gospel. The thunderbolt alludes to the nickname "Boanerges" given by Jesus to Saint John and his brother James, meaning "sons of thunder".

The three mountains represent Mounts Mayon, Isarog, and Bulusan. Above the mountains are the insignia of the Franciscan Order and below the mountains is a green palm branch that alludes to Saint Pedro Bautista, martyred in Japan, with others, among on February 5, 1597, who was erroneously considered first bishop-elect for the see of Nueva Caceres at the time of his martyrdom and hence is venerated as the secondary patron of the cathedral.

Ordinaries

Coadjutor Archbishop
Teopisto V. Alberto (1959-1965)

Auxiliary Bishops
Juan Antonio Lillo, O.F.M. (1828-1831), appointed Bishop here
Jose Tomas Sanchez (1968-1971), appointed Coadjutor Bishop of Lucena
Concordio M. Sarte (1973-1977), appointed Bishop of Legazpi
Sofio G. Balce Jr. (1980-1988), appointed Coadjutor Bishop of Cabanatuan
Jose R. Rojas Jr. (2005-2008), appointed Prelate of Libmanan

Other priests of this diocese who became bishops
Santiago Caragnan Sancho, appointed Bishop of Tuguegarao in 1917
Flaviano Barrechea Ariola, appointed Bishop of Legazpi in 1952
Wilfredo Dasco Manlapaz, appointed auxiliary bishop of Maasin in 1980 & appointed 3rd Bishop of Roman Catholic Diocese of Tagum until his retirement in 2018
Manolo Alarcon de los Santos, appointed Bishop of Virac in 1994
Adolfo Tito Camacho Yllana, appointed nuncio and titular archbishop in 2001
Gilbert Armea Garcera, appointed Bishop of Daet in 2007 and Archbishop of Lipa in 2017.
Rex Andrew Clement Alarcon, appointed Bishop of Daet in 2019

Curia
 Vicar-General – Rev. Msgr. Rodel M. Cajot, P.C.
 Chancellor – Rev. Fr. Darius S. Romualdo, J.C.D.
 Private Secretary to the Archbishop – Rev. Fr. Gerome N. Pelagio
 Oeconomus – Rev. Fr. Eugene A. Lubigan
 Judicial Vicar – Rev. Fr. Albert S. Orillo, J.C.L.

Suffragan dioceses

 Daet (comprises the entire province of Camarines Norte)
 Legazpi (comprises the entire province of Albay)
 Libmanan (comprises the 1st and 2nd Districts of Camarines Sur)
 Masbate (comprises the entire province of Masbate)
 Sorsogon (comprises the entire province of Sorsogon)
 Virac (comprises the entire province of Catanduanes)

Seminaries
Holy Rosary Major Seminary
Concepcion Pequeña, Naga City 4400
Holy Rosary Minor Seminary 
Metropolitan Cathedral Complex
Elias Angeles St., Naga City 4400
Holy Rosary Preparatory Seminary
San Jose, Camarines Sur, 4423

See also
Roman Catholicism in the Philippines

References

External links
Official Website of the Archdiocese of Cáceres
Diocese of Daet
Diocese of Legazpi
Diocese of Libmanan
Diocese of Masbate
Diocese of Sorsogon
Diocese of Virac

1595 establishments in the Philippines
Naga, Camarines Sur
Religion in Camarines Sur
Cáceres
Archdiocese